Blueprint is a CSS framework designed to reduce development time and ensure cross-browser compatibility when working with Cascading Style Sheets (CSS). It also serves as a foundation for many tools designed to make CSS development easier and more accessible to beginners. 

Blueprint is released under a modified version of the MIT License, making it free software. It can be either used as is, or further adapted for use via a compression tool that is written in Ruby.

History
Blueprint was first created by Olav Bjørkøy and released on August 3, 2007. By August 11, Blueprint included work based on ideas from Jeff Croft, Nathan Borror, Christian Metts, and Eric Meyer. Version 0.8 was released on November 11, and included various bugfixes as well as a new "tabs" plugin.

Features
Blueprint's README file lists the following features as being provided out-of-the-box:

 An easily customizable grid
 Sensible default typography
 A typographic baseline
 Perfected browser CSS reset
 A stylesheet for printing
 Powerful scripts for customization
 Bloat Minimized as much as possible

Blueprint as a foundation
One of the goals stated by the core team is to facilitate the development of new tools for working with CSS. A variety of CSS generators, visual editors, themes, and frameworks are based on Blueprint, many of which can be found on the Blueprint Wiki.

References

External links
Project Homepage

Free software
2007 software
CSS frameworks